A penumbral lunar eclipse took place on 6 August 2009, the third of four lunar eclipses in 2009. The moon's small entry into the Earth's penumbral shadow produced an extremely subtle dimming of the moon's southern edge, difficult to observe visually.

Visibility 

The eclipse was completely visible over Africa and Europe and South America. It was seen rising over eastern North America and setting over Asia.

Related eclipses

Eclipses of 2009 
 An annular solar eclipse on 26 January.
 A penumbral lunar eclipse on 9 February.
 A penumbral lunar eclipse on 7 July.
 A total solar eclipse on 22 July.
 A penumbral lunar eclipse on 6 August.
 A partial lunar eclipse on 31 December.

Lunar year cycles (354 days) 

The lunar year series repeats after 12 lunations or 354 days (Shifting back about 10 days in sequential years). Because of the date shift, the Earth's shadow will be about 11 degrees west in sequential events.

Half-Saros cycle 
A lunar eclipse will be preceded and followed by solar eclipses by 9 years and 5.5 days (a half saros). This lunar eclipse is related to two partial solar eclipses of Solar Saros 155.

Eclipse season 

This is the third eclipse this season.

First eclipse this season: 7 July 2009 Penumbral Lunar Eclipse

Second eclipse this season: 22 July 2009 Total Solar Eclipse

See also 
List of lunar eclipses and List of 21st-century lunar eclipses

Gallery

Notes

External links 
  The eclipse was captured with two digital photographs and combined into one gif file.
 

2009-08
2009 in science